The 1992–93 Michigan State Spartans men's basketball team represented Michigan State University in the 1992–93 NCAA Division I men's basketball season. The team played their home games at Breslin Center in East Lansing, Michigan and were members of the Big Ten Conference. They were coached by Jud Heathcote in his 17th year at Michigan State. The Spartans finished the season with a record of 15–13, 7–11 in Big Ten play to finish in eighth place. They received an at-large bid to the National Invitation Tournament where they lost in the first round to Oklahoma.

Previous season
The Spartans finished the 1991–92 season with a record of 22–8, 11–7 in Big Ten play to finish in third place. Michigan State received an at-large bid to the NCAA Tournament as the No. 5 seed in the Midwest region. They beat Missouri State in the First Round before losing to Cincinnati in the Second Round.

Roster 

Source

Schedule and results

|-
!colspan=9 style=| Non-conference regular season

|-
!colspan=9 style=| Big Ten regular season

|-
!colspan=9 style=|NIT

Rankings

Source.

References

Michigan State Spartans men's basketball seasons
Michigan State
Michigan State
Michigan State Spartans men's b
Michigan State Spartans men's b